Do the Best "Great Supporters Selection" is a fan-selected collection chosen through an online poll held by avex trax on Do As Infinity's official site after its disbanding. It was released among five other different Do As Infinity items on the same day. Fans were allowed to pick ten songs and a choice to leave comments; many fans from overseas also took part in the process, but only three comments from overseas fans were selected to be printed into the book, one each from Canada, United States, and Taiwan. All the names of the voters were printed in the book however. This two-disc album comprised thirty songs out of the eighty-six total Do As Infinity songs (not including any remixes or new arrangement mixes); surprisingly, not all of the band's A-sides were included in the album. The cover of the album lists the titles of the 86 songs that Do As Infinity has written so far in no particular order. There are no pictures of Do As Infinity included in the album at all.

Track listing

Disc one
  – 3:47
  – 4:23
  – 3:17
 "Summer Days" – 3:52
  – 4:29
 "Yesterday & Today" – 5:05
  – 5:08
 "We Are." – 4:25
  – 3:43
 "Oasis" – 4:43
  – 4:09
  – 4:29
  – 4:55
 "I Miss You?" – 3:49
 "Field of Dreams" – 4:56

Disc two
  – 4:50
 "TAO" – 4:36
  – 4:25
 "Week!" – 4:19
 "One or Eight" – 3:29
 "New World" – 5:24
  – 4:08
 "Under the Sun" – 4:07
  – 4:15
  – 3:37
 "Desire" – 4:30
 "Tangerine Dream" – 4:19
 "Nice & Easy" – 4:20
 "Be Free" – 4:13
  – 4:47

Chart positions

External links
 Do the Best "Great Supporters Selection" at Avex Network
 Do the Best "Great Supporters Selection" at Oricon

Do As Infinity albums
2006 greatest hits albums
Avex Group compilation albums
Albums produced by Seiji Kameda